George V (Georg Friedrich Alexander Karl Ernst August; 27 May 1819 – 12 June 1878) was the last King of Hanover, the only child and successor of King Ernest Augustus. George V's reign was ended by the Austro-Prussian War, after which Prussia annexed Hanover.

Early life
Prince George of Cumberland was born on 27 May 1819 in Berlin, the only son of Prince Ernest Augustus, Duke of Cumberland and Teviotdale. Ernest Augustus was the fifth son of George III of the United Kingdom and his wife, Charlotte of Mecklenburg-Strelitz.

He was baptised on 8 July 1819 at a hotel in Berlin where his parents were staying, by the Rev. Henry Thomas Austen (brother of author Jane Austen). His godparents were the then Prince Regent George IV of the United Kingdom (represented by the Duke of Cumberland), King Frederick William III of Prussia, Emperor Alexander I of Russia, the Crown Prince of Prussia, Prince William of Prussia, Prince Frederick of Prussia, Prince Henry of Prussia, Prince Wilhelm of Prussia, the Grand Duke Georg of Mecklenburg-Strelitz, Duke Charles of Mecklenburg, Empress Maria Feodorovna, the Queen of the Netherlands Wilhelmine of Prussia, the Princess Augusta Sophia of the United Kingdom, the Hereditary Princess of Hesse-Homburg Princess Elizabeth of the United Kingdom, the Princess Mary (Duchess of Gloucester and Edinburgh), Princess Sophia of the United Kingdom, Princess Alexandrine of Prussia, the Electoral Princess Augusta of Hesse-Kassel, the Duchess of Anhalt-Dessau Princess Frederica Wilhelmina of Prussia, Princess Maria Anna of Hesse-Homburg (Princess William of Prussia), Margravine Elisabeth Louise of Brandenburg-Schwedt (Princess Ferdinand of Prussia), Princess Louisa of Prussia, and Princess Radziwill.

George spent his childhood in Berlin and in Great Britain. He lost the sight of one eye following a childhood illness in 1828, and in the other eye following an accident in 1833. His father had hoped that the young prince might marry his cousin Queen Victoria, who was older by three days, thus keeping the British and Hanoverian thrones united, but nothing came of the plan.

Crown Prince
Upon the death of King William IV and the accession of Queen Victoria to the British throne, the 123-year personal union of the British and Hanoverian thrones ended because Hanover's semi-Salic law prevented a woman from ascending its throne. The Duke of Cumberland succeeded to the Hanoverian throne as Ernest Augustus, and Prince George became the Crown Prince of Hanover. As a legitimate descendant of George III in the male line, he remained a member of the British royal family and second in line to the British throne until the birth of Queen Victoria's first child, Victoria, Princess Royal, in 1840. Since he was totally blind, there were doubts as to whether the Crown Prince was qualified to succeed as king of Hanover, but his father decided that he should do so.

Marriage
George married, on 18 February 1843, at Hanover, Princess Marie of Saxe-Altenburg, the eldest daughter of Joseph, Duke of Saxe-Altenburg, by his wife, Duchess Amelia of Württemberg.

King of Hanover

The Crown Prince succeeded his father as the King of Hanover and Duke of Brunswick-Lüneburg as well as Duke of Cumberland and Teviotdale, in the Peerage of Great Britain and Earl of Armagh, in the Peerage of Ireland, on 18 November 1851, assuming the style George V.

From his father and from his maternal uncle, Prince Charles Frederick of Mecklenburg-Strelitz, one of the most influential men at the Prussian court, George had learned to take a very high and autocratic view of royal authority. During his 15-year reign, he engaged in frequent disputes with the Hanoverian Landtag (parliament).

George was generally supportive of Austria in the Diet of the German Confederation. As the Austro-Prussian War started, the Prussian government sent a dispatch on 15 June 1866 demanding that Hanoverian troops submit to their authority or face war.  Despite previously having concluded that Hanover could not win an armed confrontation with Prussia, George remained protective of his throne and refused the ultimatum. Contrary to the wishes of the parliament, Hanover joined the Austrian camp in the war.  As a result, the Prussian army occupied Hanover and the Hanoverian army surrendered on 29 June 1866 following the Battle of Langensalza, the King and royal family having fled to Austria.  The Prussian government formally annexed Hanover on 20 September 1866, despite the King of Prussia, William I, being a first cousin of King George V of Hanover; their mothers were sisters. The deposed King never renounced his rights to the defunct throne or acknowledged Prussia's actions. From exile in Gmunden, Austria, he appealed in vain for the European great powers to intervene on behalf of Hanover. From 1866 to 1870, George V maintained the Guelphic Legion partially at his own expense.

While in exile, he was appointed an honorary full general in the British army in 1876.

Death
George V died at his residence in the Rue de Presbourg, Paris, on 12 June 1878. After a funeral service in the Lutheran Church at the Rue Chaucat, his body was removed to England and buried in St George's Chapel at Windsor Castle.

Legacy
The King supported industrial development. In 1856 the "Georgs-Marien-Bergwerks- und Hüttenverein" was founded which was named after him and his wife. The company erected an iron and steel works which gave the city Georgsmarienhütte its name.

Titles, styles, honours and arms

Titles and styles
27 May 1819 – 20 June 1837: His Royal Highness Prince George of Cumberland
 20 June 1837 – 18 November 1851: His Royal Highness The Crown Prince of Hanover
 18 November 1851 – 12 June 1878: His Majesty The King of Hanover

Honours

Arms

By grant dated 15 August 1835, George's arms in right of the United Kingdom were those of his father (being the arms of the United Kingdom, differenced by a label argent of three points, the centre point charged with a fleur-de-lys azure, and each of the other points charged with a cross gules), the whole differenced by a label gules bearing a horse courant argent.

Ancestry

Issue

References

External links

 Die Welfen – George V (with portrait) 

|-

Kings of Hanover
Princes of the United Kingdom
Hanoverian princes
House of Hanover
Burials at St George's Chapel, Windsor Castle
Sons of kings
Dukes of Cumberland and Teviotdale
People from Berlin
1819 births
1878 deaths
Blind royalty and nobility
Crown Princes of Hanover
Knights of the Garter
Grand Croix of the Légion d'honneur
Grand Crosses of the Order of Saint Stephen of Hungary
Commanders Cross of the Military Order of Maria Theresa
Knights of the Golden Fleece of Spain